Sal Iacono (born July 5, 1971), also known as Cousin Sal, is an American comedian, writer, and game show host. He is known for his roles on The Man Show and the late night television show Jimmy Kimmel Live!. He is Jimmy Kimmel's cousin, hence his nickname Cousin Sal.

Early life
Iacono was born in Brooklyn to Fran Iacono and Vincent Iacono. He graduated from Elwood-John Glenn High School in 1989 and attended SUNY Oswego, earning a degree in Public Justice in 1993.

He went on to study law at Touro Law Center in Huntington, New York on Long Island, receiving his Juris Doctor in 1996. In 1997, Iacono moved from Long Island to Hollywood to pursue a career in television.

Career

Television writing and hosting
Iacono's first foray into television writing was on the Fox Sports program Sports Geniuses, a sports-themed game show starring Matt Vasgersian on which Sal also appeared nightly in a trivia challenge. From there, he joined the writing staff of Comedy Central's The Man Show starring Adam Carolla and Iacono's cousin Jimmy Kimmel. In 2002, Iacono joined Kimmel during his weekly prognostication sketches on Fox NFL Sunday. Iacono wrote for the puppet show Crank Yankers.

When Win Ben Stein's Money co-host Nancy Pimental left the show in 2002, Iacono replaced her, becoming Ben Stein's co-host and comic tormentor. Iacono was the co-host through the rest of the run of the series and was nominated for an Emmy Award in the Outstanding Game Show Host category.

Jimmy Kimmel Live!
Iacono has been a permanent member of the Jimmy Kimmel Live! writing staff since 2003. He also appears frequently on the show in comedy sketches. These comedy bits are often shot using a hidden camera, and "Cousin Sal" either helps Jimmy  prank their aunt Chippy or he pretends to be a store employee or delivery person who is incredibly inept or annoying. Cousin Sal's victims are invariably dumbfounded or become extremely infuriated, much to the delight of the viewing audience.

WWE
On Jimmy Kimmel Live! on May 16, 2008, Iacono had a birthday cake delivered to Kimmel on air by his favorite wrestler Rowdy Roddy Piper. He and Piper were confronted by Santino Marella, who had the cake thrown on him and was attacked by Iacono. The following Monday, Marella (dressed as Piper) brought Iacono to the ring on Monday Night Raw to "apologize" to "Cousin Sal". The real Piper entered the ring and Marella got his own apology cake thrown on him and on his way back to the locker room, he challenged Iacono to a wrestling match, which Piper accepted on Iacono's behalf. The match took place at the Friday Night SmackDown! tapings in Los Angeles on June 3, 2008. Sal was accompanied to the ring by Kimmel and Piper, and won the match.

Podcasts
Iacono is a regular guest on The Bill Simmons Podcast. "Cousin Sal" picks the lines for the next weeks NFL games, defends the Dallas Cowboys, and talks about sports and sports betting with Bill. Sal also joined the Adam Carolla Podcast on Mondays during the 2010 NFL season to discuss the previous Sunday's NFL action. In May 2017, Iacono became host of the 'Against All Odds' gambling podcast, part of Simmons's Ringer Podcast Network.

In July 2020 Iacono debuted a new podcast called Extra Points with his friend Dave Dameshek as part of a newly formed sports gambling media company of the same name founded by Iacono.

Writing 

Along with his appearances on Bill Simmons's podcast, Sal was also a regular columnist on Grantland.com, which was a sports and pop culture website formerly run by Simmons.

His book, You Can't Lose Them All was released in early 2021.

Fox Sports 
Sal is an analyst on Fox sports gambling show Fox Bet Live. Its series premier was on September 10, 2018.

In 2002, Sal was a guest prognosticator with his cousin Jimmy Kimmel on FOX NFL Sunday. In addition, starting in 2019 for FOX NFL Thursday, Sal will be the prognosticator. Kimmel has also made a guest appearance on it.

Personal life
Iacono currently resides near Los Angeles with his wife, Melissa, and three sons, Archie, Jack, and Harrison (aka Harriso).

References

External links
 Jimmy Kimmel Live! website
 

1971 births
American game show hosts
American male comedians
American people of Italian descent
American podcasters
Living people
People from Brooklyn
New York (state) lawyers
State University of New York at Oswego alumni
Touro Law Center alumni
Comedians from New York (state)
21st-century American comedians
Fox Sports 1 people